Alfred Luseno Sorongo (born December 20, 1981) is a Kenyan cricketer. He is a right-handed batsman and a right-arm medium-pace bowler.

International career
Luseno played at the Under-19 World Cup in 2002 for his Kenyan team, where they reached Plate Group One, and soon received his first One Day International callup, against Sri Lanka in the Cherry Blossom Sharjah Cup 2003. In this game, he scored a duck, batting at number eleven, and unable to stop a Sri Lankan onslaught spearheaded by centurion Kumar Sangakkara.

He played one match during the Inter-Continental Cup of 2004, against Uganda, and also played in a Kenyan tour of Bangladesh in March 2006. In late 2007 he was recalled to the Kenya squad to face Bermuda and Canada in both Intercontinental cup matches and three One Day Internationals, taking career best figures of 4/32 in the third One day match.

References

External links
 
 

1981 births
Living people
Kenyan cricketers
Kenya One Day International cricketers
Northern Nomads cricketers
People from Kakamega